Alexander Birkin may refer to:

Anno Birkin, (Alexander Birkin, 1980–2001), English poet and musician
Alexander Birkin, (1861–1942) of the Birkin baronets

See also
Birkin (surname)